Luhe County is a county of eastern Guangdong province, China. It is under the administration of Shanwei City. The majority of Luhe residents come from Hakka ancestry and speak a local dialect rooted in the Hakka language.

Local Cuisine

Luhe is well known for the Hakka 'pounded tea'., as well as sweet puffed rice cakes and preserved fruit.

References

County-level divisions of Guangdong
Hakka culture in China
Shanwei